Hibbertia pilifera is a species of flowering plant in the family Dilleniaceae and is endemic to New South Wales. It is a small, spreading to low-lying shrub with linear to oblong leaves and yellow flowers arranged singly on the ends of branchlets, with three to five stamens in a single cluster on one side of two carpels.

Description
Flowering mainly occurs from September to November.

Taxonomy
Hibbertia pilifera was first formally described in 2012 by Hellmut R. Toelken in the Journal of the Adelaide Botanic Gardens from specimens collected in 1966 in Bungonia State Recreation Area. The specific epithet (pilifera) means "hair-bearing".

Distribution and habitat
This hibbertia grows in open woodland in scattered locations from Scone, New South Wales to Bungonia State Recreation Area in central New South Wales.

See also
List of Hibbertia species

References

pilifera
Flora of New South Wales
Plants described in 2012
Taxa named by Hellmut R. Toelken